Ryan Edward Borris (born 7 June 1983) is a Scottish former footballer who last played for Renfrew in the West of Scotland Football League. 

He has previously played in the Scottish Football League First Division for Ayr United and also played 'senior' for Dumbarton, Raith Rovers, Stirling Albion and Stranraer.

After leaving Stranraer, Borris joined Junior side Kilbirnie Ladeside in June 2014. He later had a season at Hurlford United before moving to Glenafton Athletic in July 2016.

He then finished his career with lower league side Renfrew.

References

1983 births
Scottish footballers
Dumbarton F.C. players
Raith Rovers F.C. players
Stirling Albion F.C. players
Ayr United F.C. players
Stranraer F.C. players
Kilbirnie Ladeside F.C. players
Hurlford United F.C. players
Glenafton Athletic F.C. players
Scottish Football League players
Scottish Junior Football Association players
Living people
Association football forwards
Footballers from Paisley, Renfrewshire
West of Scotland Football League players
Renfrew F.C. players